The Glasgow University Muslim Students Association (GUMSA, pronounced gəmsjɑː) is an Islamic society aimed at catering to Muslim and non-Muslim students at the University of Glasgow. GUMSA was established in 1968,. It is the longest running Muslim student organisation in Scotland and one of the oldest in the United Kingdom.

History

1968–1973 
The society was founded on 11 November 1968 under the guidance of Professor Salah Shahin from the University of the West of Scotland,  who approached a group of youth at the University of Glasgow to form a Muslim student organisation. On 11 November 1968, the inaugural meeting for the society took place in the Glasgow University Union extension. The meeting was advertised in the Glasgow University Guardian:"Dear Sir, The inaugural meeting of the Glasgow University Muslims Students' Association was held in the Union Extension on 11/11/68.The Association aims to provide a meeting place for the many Muslim Students at Glasgow University, from different parts of the world and also a forum for discussion for discussion with other interested student bodies at Glasgow, and thereby help to foster a better spirit of understanding. The Association, therefore, cordially extends an invitation to ALL students to their weekly meetings.For further information please contact:Mr Mohamed Aslam Ebrahim,The Secretary,Glasgow University Students' Association c/o Mens' Union"  The inaugural members kept GUMSA running for its first four years, but elections were not held. Publicity was achieved via hand written flyers which were posted across campus. The group also ventured between different faculties inviting individuals to attend the GUMSA meetings. Meetings were held in a space granted by the university, and would take place on a monthly basis, with roughly 20-25 individuals attending and different speakers being invited. The society was met with no resistance and had regular interfaith contact, particularly with the Christian Union. "Iftaars" for the breaking of fast were held for the community in Ramadhan. Members would bring home-cooked food to these events.

In the same year of founding, the first Scottish President of the Federation of Student Islamic Societies was elected - Aziz Khan - who was also a GUMSA member. In 1971, GUMSA members helped to form their sister society at the University of Strathclyde, which would go on to be known as The Strathclyde University Muslim Students Association (SUMSA).

1974–1976 
Following the departure of the founding members, the organisation began to dwindle in size and underwent periods of inactivity, notably in 1973 following the departure of founder Dr Ibrahim and again in 1976 following the departure of the President of 3 years, Dr Mahmoud Akhtar.

1987–1991 
In 1987, Prof Dr Mohd Tengku Sembok provided leadership to the society. Sembok later went on to become a prominent member of the academic circle in Malaysia.Despite the new levels of engagement the organisation had found, GUMSA was unable to match the popularity of 'GUAsia,' which was more favoured by individuals of South Asian descent. This, in conjunction with the Malaysian government providing significantly less funding for overseas study grants, resulted a larger portion of GUMSA's member populace coming directly from the city of Glasgow.

1991–1992 
Whilst there was no pause in GUMSA's running between the academic session of 1990 and 1991, there was no communication between the individuals who were given leadership of the society and those who were previously in charge. The society at this time was run by 2 individuals who had previously never been to a GUMSA event - Ruzwan Mohammed and Zahid Hanif. Due to this, the society was restructured.

The society made hoodies for the first time (see picture of "Shaykh Ruzwan Mohammed" in photo gallery below), but as was common, had little engagement when compared with the Pakistani society of the time. Ruzwan, who served as the "chairman" at the time, made a concerted effort to keep in contact with the society following his departure from the University and was delivering lectures for the society as little as 7 years later in 1999. He continues to hold a yearly class for the society.

1994–1999 

Following a short period of inactivity, GUMSA would soon be taken over by some of the most active members it has seen to date. The society again had to start from scratch with initial meetings taking place in a mosque off the University campus on Oakfield Avenue. Many large events were held by the committee in this period, such as in the University Bute hall with renowned nasheed artist yusuf islam (formerly Cat Stevens), ground breaking lectures, including "Islam: Oppressed or Oppressive," and a unique play titled "The return of Salahudeen" featuring prominent figures in the Muslim community. Muslim speaker Imam Siraj Wahhaj also visited the society to speak, the event took place on the Glasgow University Campus in the Wellington Church. The era saw the society make a website for its first time – a feat which was a rare achievement for the time period- Imran Kausar learned how to code and apply website design language in the University's first (and only) computer lab in order to bring the site to life.

Following a trip to London for the "Islam and Science" conference which was delivered by Prof Salim Al-Hassani, a crash led to the minibus (which was hired from the Students' Representative Council) being written off. The society was not allowed to hire the minibus for a number of years following this incident.

The period also became one of the most politically active the society has seen. Many members ran for positions within the Students' Representative Council (SRC) - particularly for positions within the council executive committee, below is a summary:

Around this time period GUMSA helped another of its sister organisations to form - CUMSA (Caledonian University Muslim Students Organisation), which would grow into another prominent and active society within Muslim community of Glasgow.

The general secretary of the society was Dr Azhar Ali, during these years Dr Ali also went on to revive the FOSIS Scotland branch. Since his University days he has gone on to become the executive director of the Institute for Healthcare Improvement (IHI) in America).

The period was also the first time in which the society held an "Islam Awareness Week", which it continues to hold to this day. The week involved interfaith events which were amongst the first being held in Scotland at that time.

2000-2004 
2003 saw the first big change in the logo used by the organisation. A GUMSA member - Maarya Sharif sketched a design of someone in "sujood" or 'prostration' as Muslims do when they carry out their 5 daily prayers. The logo was then uploaded to a digital format from the sketch. This iteration of the logo was used 2003-2016, yet the concept of a Muslim in prostration continued onto the next logo version.

On Friday 6 July 2007 Aijaz Mohammad (who was President in 2003) won the "Male Inspirational Young Scottish Muslim Award" at the inaugural "Young Scottish Muslims Conference & Awards". He was awarded for his work in numerous organisations, among them his role as "chair of GUMSA."

In 2003, the society was once again started, almost from scratch due to lack of proper progression planning.

2005-2007 
In 2005 GUMSA saw President Humza Yousaf MSP take lead of the society. He has since gone on to become the Minister for Europe and Development, Minister for Transport and the Islands and Cabinet Secretary for Justice.

The first 'Interfaith Dinner' was also held, one of GUMSA's biggest events which attracts people of all faith and none to come together and enjoy a free 3 course meal courtesy of the society. The event has become of the society's annual calendar during "Islam Awareness Week."

Reverend Leith Fisher, who was formerly the minister at the nearby Wellington Church, passed away whilst fundraising for GUMSA in these years. The cause was raising funds for Palestine.

In 2006 the society started focusing more on charitable activities, in particular "Water Wells Week" for which the organisation helped fund water wells in impoverished areas in the developing world. The society raised a total of £10,000 in just one week.

The society held their first 'outdoor' prayer near the library during "Islam Awareness Week" as part of an ongoing project to make people more aware of Muslim forms of worship.

In 2007 the 'Interfaith room' was introduced as the first full-time place of worship on the University campus, after needs were seen for it by the interfaith chaplain at the time, Reverend Stuart MacQuarrie.

2008-2012 
In 2008 whilst Ahmed Shaikh was President, the society saw a number of improvements for Muslim students on campus.

The first library prayer room was established in this time period on level 3 of the main Glasgow University library. Prior to this students were praying in corridors and in stairwells which led to the University Chaplain Reverend Stuart Macquarrie commissioning the new space. The space has since moved many times within the building and has also seen the introduction of complimentary ablution facilities. Discussions also began for a space in the dental school which would be made 3 years later.

The society also hosted the first year round Islamic course in Glasgow - ISyllabus, the course was taught by two of the UK's most prominent Islamic thinkers - Shaykh Ruzwan Mohammed (who was President of GUMSA in 1990) and Shaykh Amer Jamil (who had been the Vice-President of SUMSA) in the University's Boyd Orr Building. The course has been run in the University every year since, and has spread to other universities such as Birmingham, Manchester, Bristol, Newcastle, Dundee, Edinburgh and has plans to move to London.

The University also started supplying halal chicken in official cafeterias across campus, which has vastly improved ease of consumption for Muslim students on campus.

The academic year 2008/09 also saw the society bring "Charity Week" (see "Activities") to Scotland. In this period over £50,000 was raised for orphans and needy children across the world. GUMSA has participated in Charity Week every year since.

Activities

Freshers' Week 

Freshers' week takes place a week before classes begin at the University of Glasgow. GUMSA traditionally hosts daily activities Monday - Saturday during this week including the following set-up:
 Monday - Meet and Greet Event
 Tuesday - BBQ in Kelvingrove Park
 Wednesday - Social Event
 Thursday - Freshers' Dinner
 Friday - Friday Prayers & Tour of the City
 Saturday - Day trip to local Scottish Attraction

Charity Week 

Every year in October, GUMSA participates in Charity week with Islamic societies (also known as 'isoc/isocs') across the UK to raise money for orphans and needy children. Activities change on a yearly basis, however in previous years these have included football tournaments, bake sales, speaker events as well as dinners. During this week GUMSA raised over £4,015.11 in 2017.

Islam Awareness Week 
Islam Awareness Week normally takes place in February with an aim of uniting the interfaith community of Glasgow University Campus. There is a stall daily during the week outside the Glasgow University Library for individuals to ask questions about Islam and find out more about the faith. The following events are also regular occurrences:
 Monday to Thursday - Stall
 Wednesday - Topical panel discussion
 Thursday - Interfaith Dinner 
 Friday - Open Friday Prayer

Annual Interfaith Dinner 

The GUMSA Annual Interfaith Dinner has grown in repute in recent years, attracting hundreds of students of all faiths and none to a free three-course meal. In 2017, the dinner attracted Glasgow University Rector and prominent human rights lawyer Aamer Anwar as a keynote speaker. The dinner has helped developed bonds and has been praised for its role in interfaith dialogue on campus.

Islam Awareness Week flag 

In 2017 for the first time the University flew the GUMSA flag as a tribute to the celebrations taking place during Islam Awareness week. The move was met with praise across campus.

Believe and Do Good Month 
In the month of February GUMSA participates in a national campaign in collaboration with FOSIS and Muslim Association of Britain which instructs its members to partake in activities that help the community and in general 'do good' based on the Quranic verse "Except those who Believe and Do Good Righteous Deeds. Theirs is a never ending reward" - Quran [95:6]. Previous activities have included graveyard clean ups and community blood donations. A particularly popular activity was the donation of knitted hats to a local hospital ward for newborns in 2018.

Annual Ramadan Iftaar 
GUMSA holds a yearly iftaar during the Islamic month of Ramadan. The iftaar has built up notoriety in recent years and has become the largest gathering of Muslims for the breaking of their fast in Scotland.

Friday Prayers 

The society organises weekly speakers (khateebs) for the congregational prayer every Friday. Two prayer timings are provided so that students with class can have a larger chance of being able to attend. Notable regular speakers for the sermons include Ustadh Shoket Aksi, Shaykh Sohaib Saeed, Shaykh Amin Buxton Ustadh Zubeir Alvi, Ustadh Ahmed Shaikh & Shaykh Amer Jamil.

Educational and religious activities 

GUMSA is involved in various other activities throughout the year. The society hosts "circles" weekly for individuals to come and speak about their faith, but also as an outlet away from University life.  In recent years the society has also hosted reputable Muslim scholars from across the globe. Most notably these have included Shaykh Muhammad al-Yaqoubi, Mufti Ismail ibn Musa Menk, Imam Siraj Wahhaj and Shaykh Ruzwan Mohammed. The latter hosts a revision lecture series at GUMSA on a yearly basis. The society also hosts social events on a monthly basis ranging from tea nights to ice skating.

Awards 
Over the years the society has won a number of different awards from various bodies including, but not limited to, the following:

References

External links
Muslims in Britain, accessed 21 March 2018
Independent news site, accessed 21 March 2018
Glasgow student scoops inspirational award, accessed 21 March 2018
Sharing of Faith, accessed 21 March 2018
https://thetab.com/uk/glasgow/2017/03/20/ Yiannopoulos comments attempt to disrupt unity on campus says President of Gumsa
Official Website, accessed 24 March 2018

Islamic organisations based in the United Kingdom
Clubs and societies of the University of Glasgow
Former Presidents of GUMSA (Glasgow University Muslim Students Association)
Islamic organizations established in 1968